Power Rangers is an entertainment and merchandising franchise built around a live-action superhero television series, based on the Japanese tokusatsu franchise Super Sentai. Produced first by Saban Entertainment, second by BVS Entertainment, later by Saban Brands, and today by SCG Power Rangers LLC and its parent company, Hasbro, the Power Rangers television series takes much of its footage from the Super Sentai television series, produced by Toei Company. The first Power Rangers entry, Mighty Morphin Power Rangers, debuted on August 28, 1993, and helped launch the Fox Kids programming block of the 1990s, during which it catapulted into popular culture along with a line of action figures and other toys by Bandai. By 2001, the media franchise had generated over $6 billion in toy sales.

Despite initial criticism that its action violence targeted child audiences, the franchise has been commercially successful. As of 2022, Power Rangers consists of 29 television seasons of 21 different themed series and three theatrical films released in 1995, 1997, and 2017.

In 2010, Haim Saban, creator of the series, regained ownership of the franchise. It was previously owned for eight years by The Walt Disney Company. In 2018, Hasbro was named the new master toy licensee. Shortly afterwards, Saban Brands and Hasbro announced that the latter would acquire the franchise and the rest of the former's entertainment assets in a $522 million deal, with the first products from Hasbro becoming available in early 2019.

Premise

Since Power Rangers derives most of its footage from the Super Sentai series, it features many hallmarks that distinguish it from other superhero series.  Each series revolves around a team of youths recruited and trained by a mentor to morph into the eponymous Power Rangers, able to use special powers and pilot immense assault machines, called Zords, to overcome the periodic antagonists. In the original series Mighty Morphin, the wizard Zordon recruits "teenagers with attitude" against Rita Repulsa.

When "morphed," the rangers become powerful superheroes wearing color-coded skin-tight spandex suits and helmets with opaque visors; identical except in individual rangers' color, helmet design, and minor styling such as incorporating a skirt. Morphed Rangers generally possess enhanced strength, durability, agility and combat prowess. Some possess superhuman or psychic abilities such as super-speed, element manipulation, extra-sensory perception or invisibility. In addition, each individual ranger has a unique weapon, as well as common weaponry used for ground fighting. When enemies grow to incredible size (as nearly all do), Rangers use individual Zords that combine into a larger Megazord.

Rangers teams operate in teams of three to five, with more Rangers joining the team later. Each team of Rangers, with a few exceptions, obeys a general set of conventions, outlined at the beginning of Mighty Morphin and implied by mentors throughout many of the other series: Power Rangers may not use their Ranger powers for personal gain or for escalating a fight (unless the enemy does so), nor may the Power Rangers disclose their identities to the general public. The penalty for disobeying these rules is the loss of their power.

As in Super Sentai, the color palette of each Power Rangers team changes every series. Only Red and Blue appear in every Ranger team, while a Yellow Ranger has been present in every series except Power Rangers Dino Charge and Power Rangers Dino Fury. Other colors and designations also appear throughout the series. A Rangers' color designation also influences their wardrobe throughout the series: civilian clothing often matches Ranger color.

History

Adapting the Super Sentai series
The idea of adapting Sentai series for America emerged in the late 1970s after the agreement between Toei Company and Marvel Comics to exchange concepts to adapt them to their respective audiences. Toei, with Marvel Productions, created the Japanese Spider-Man television series, and produced three Super Sentai series, which had great success in Japan. Marvel and Stan Lee tried to sell the Sun Vulcan series to American television stations including HBO, but found no buyers and the agreement ended.

Several years later, another idea to adapt Super Sentai began in the 80s when Haim Saban made a business trip to Japan, in which, during his stay at the hotel, the only thing that was being transmitted on his television was the Japanese series Choudenshi Bioman. At that time, Saban was fascinated by the concept of 5 people masked in spandex suits fighting monsters, so in 1985, he produced the pilot episode of Bio-Man, an American adaptation of Choudenshi Bioman, which was rejected by several of the largest American television stations. His idea only took off in 1992, as Saban came to Fox Kids, whose president Margaret Loesch had previously helmed Marvel Productions and thus was familiar with Super Sentai.

Production of Power Rangers episodes involves extensive localization of and revision of original Super Sentai source material to incorporate American culture and conform to American television standards. Rather than making an English dub or translation of the Japanese footage, Power Rangers programs consist of scenes featuring English-speaking actors spliced with scenes featuring either Japanese actors dubbed into English or the action scenes from the Super Sentai Series featuring the Rangers fighting monsters or the giant robot (Zord and Megazord) battles with English dubbing. In some series, original fight scenes are filmed to incorporate characters or items unique to the Power Rangers production. Like many of Saban Entertainment previous ventures in localizing Japanese television for a Western audience, the plot, character names, and other names usually differ greatly from the source footage, though a few seasons have stayed close to the story of the original Super Sentai season. The American arm of Bandai, who co-produced the Sentai shows and manufactured its toys, worked with the adaptation of the Japanese names. A brainstorming among executives led to "Power Rangers", and for the specific show that would be made, Mighty Morphin Power Rangers, evoking the transformation sequences. The meeting also brought up the term "Zord" for the giant robots, to invoke both the sword that the Megazord carried, and the dinosaurs that were the team's theme. Along with adapting the villains from the Super Sentai counterparts, most Power Rangers series also feature villains with no Sentai counterpart. Generally, the primary antagonist of a Power Rangers series (for example, Lord Zedd, Divatox, etc.) are not adapted from the Sentai. Exceptions to this includes Mighty Morphin, Zeo, Lightspeed Rescue and a few others which only use villains adapted from the Japanese shows.

The franchise began with Mighty Morphin Power Rangers (an American adaptation of the 1992 Japanese Super Sentai Series, Kyōryū Sentai Zyuranger), which began broadcasting as part of the Fox Broadcasting Company's Fox Kids programming block.

In honour of Mighty Morphin Power Rangers'''s broadcast premiere, Hasbro announced "National Power Rangers Day" to be celebrated annually on August 28, 2018.

Broadcast and Production
1993–2010
Saban Entertainment produced and distributed Power Rangers from 1993 until the end of 2001, with Fox Kids broadcasting the series in the United States until the Fall of 2002. The Walt Disney Company acquired the franchise as part of a larger buyout of Fox Family Worldwide that took place in 2001. Fox Family Worldwide subsequently became ABC Family Worldwide Inc. This buyout also saw Saban Entertainment become BVS Entertainment in 2002, from News Corporation, Fox's parent company, and Haim Saban.

From September 2002, Power Rangers had aired on various Disney-owned networks, including the ABC Kids program block on ABC, the ABC Family and Toon Disney cable networks, and Jetix-branded outlets worldwide. Disney moved production of the franchise from Los Angeles to New Zealand after Wild Force ended, resulting in the closure of MMPR Productions. Several ABC affiliate broadcasting groups, including Hearst Television, declined to air the series due to the lack of FCC-compliant educational and informational content.

2008's Power Rangers Jungle Fury was originally set to be the final season, but due to obligations with Bandai, Disney would produce 2009's Power Rangers RPM. An article in The New Zealand Herald published on March 7, 2009, identified RPM as the last season of the Power Rangers run. Production manager Sally Campbell stated in an interview, "...at this stage we will not be shooting another season." A September 1, 2009, revision to Disney A to Z: The Official Encyclopedia by Disney's head archivist Dave Smith states that "production of new episodes [of Power Rangers] ceased in 2009". Production of Power Rangers ceased and the  series by BVS Entertainment, RPM, ended on December 26, 2009.

On October 1, 2009, Bandai released a press release stating that Disney would re-broadcast Mighty Morphin Power Rangers in January 2010 on ABC Kids in lieu of producing a new season. A new toy line accompanied the broadcast and appeared in stores in the later part of 2009.

2011–2021
On May 12, 2010, Haim Saban bought back the Power Rangers franchise from Disney for $43 million and announced plans to produce a new season of the television series. Beginning with the eighteenth season, Samurai (using footage from the 2009 Super Sentai series, Samurai Sentai Shinkenger) the series would be produced under Saban Capital Group's new Saban Brands subsidiary and premiere on Nickelodeon on February 7, 2011. Reruns of previous seasons and episodes would also begin airing on sister channel Nicktoons later that year. In addition to Samurai, Saban announced plans to make a new Power Rangers movie.

On July 2, 2012, Saban Brands announced that would it launch a new Saturday morning cartoon block on The CW, called Vortexx, on August 25, 2012, with reruns of Power Rangers Lost Galaxy to air on the block.

On October 1, 2013, Saban Brands announced that it had extended agreements for the franchise with Nickelodeon and Bandai America Incorporated through 2016. In January 2016, Saban and Nickelodeon extended their broadcast partnership through 2018. In February 2018, it was announced that Power Rangers would continue airing on Nickelodeon through 2021. That same month, Saban Brands appointed Hasbro as the global master toy licensee for Power Rangers in April 2019 with a future option to purchase the franchise. On May 1, 2018, Saban would agree to sell Power Rangers and other entertainment assets to Hasbro for US$522 million in cash and stock. The Saban Brands subsidiary ended operations upon the closure of the deal on July 2, 2018.

The twenty-sixth and twenty-seventh seasons, Power Rangers Beast Morphers, would produced by Hasbro's Allspark studio. Beginning with the twenty-eighth season, Power Rangers Dino Fury, the series is being produced by Entertainment One (which was acquired by Hasbro on December 30, 2019, and merged with Allspark in October 2020).

2021–present
In late April 2021, actor Chance Perez announced in an interview that the second season of Power Rangers Dino Fury (the twenty-ninth season overall) would premiere on Netflix in 2022; making it the first season of the series to premiere exclusively online through a streaming service. Meanwhile, new episodes of the series moved to the streaming service on June 15, 2021.

On June 14, 2022, it was announced that Jenny Klein will serve as showrunner for a Power Rangers television series that is being developed by Entertainment One for Netflix. It has been reported that she will work alongside Jonathan Entwistle.

Television series

The first six seasons (beginning with Mighty Morphin Power Rangers and ending with In Space) followed an overarching, evolving storyline. The second season began the annual tradition of the Rangers acquiring new Zords to battle enemies while the core suits from the first season were used, except for that of the White Ranger. With the fourth season, Zeo, Power Rangers began following the Super Sentai series' practice of annual Ranger suit changes.

Although the seventh season, Lost Galaxy, had ties with the preceding season, it was otherwise the first season to follow a self-contained story, as would later seasons of the show up until the seventeenth, RPM. The season also began the tradition of team-up episodes featuring Rangers, villains, and other characters from past seasons.

Beginning with the eighteenth season, Samurai, the show returned to a multi-season format similar to Mighty Morphin Power Rangers, with self-contained storylines told across two seasons each.

The upcoming thirtieth season, Cosmic Fury, was announced to be a continuation of Dino Fury's story.

Feature filmsPower Rangers has been adapted into three theatrical motion pictures. The first two are distributed by 20th Century Fox, while the third film was released in 2017 by Lionsgate.

In May 2014, Saban Brands and Lionsgate announced that they are planning to produce a new Power Rangers feature film. The movie, titled simply Power Rangers, was released on March 24, 2017 to mixed reviews and a low performance at the box office. A fourth Power Rangers film is currently in development by Entertainment One and Netflix. On July 11, 2019, during a Reddit AMA, Dacre Montgomery revealed that the studio had plans to produce a second reboot, without him and the rest of the cast and the director returning. On December 13, 2019, it was reported that Jonathan Entwistle is in early talks to direct the reboot, with Patrick Burleigh being set to write the screenplay. The plot will reportedly involve time travel and will be set in the 1990s.

DistributionPower Rangers has long had success in international markets and continues to air in many countries. As of 2006, Power Rangers aired at least 65 times a week in more than 40 worldwide markets. Many markets carry or have carried the series on their respective Fox or later Jetix/Disney XD channels or have syndicated the program on regional children's channels or blocks, either dubbed into the local language or broadcast in the original English. Since the 2010 acquisition by Saban Brands, international television distribution rights for Power Rangers have been managed by MarVista Entertainment until early-2019.

Broadcast in East Asian territories has been treated differently from in other international markets due to the prevalence and familiarity of 'the Super Sentai brand originating in Japan. Power Rangers was briefly banned in Malaysia for supposedly encouraging the use of drugs because it contained the word "Morphin'" in its title, which could be associated with morphine. The show eventually aired without the offending word. In Japan, many Power Rangers television seasons and movies were dubbed into Japanese for television and video with the voice actors often pulled from past Super Sentai casts, leading to the English-dubbed action sequences being "re-dubbed" or "restored" back to Japanese as well. Power Rangers Mystic Force is the latest season to be broadcast in Japan on Toei Channel in January 2014, with another cast voicing the American counterparts. After broadcast of Power Rangers ended in South Korea with Wild Force, Bandai of Korea started airing dubbed Super Sentai series under the 파워레인저 (Power Ranger) brand on JEI TV. Some seasons of Super Sentai broadcast in South Korea have similarly named titles as their American counterparts, such as Power Ranger Dino Thunder for Abaranger in 2007 and Power Ranger S.P.D. in place of Dekaranger.

Home media
On VHS,  Power Rangers video cassettes had been sold in the United States by early 1994.

, 33 Power Rangers DVD collections have been released in the United States:
 Mighty Morphin Power Rangers: The Movie, 1995; 20th Century Fox Home Entertainment
 Turbo: A Power Rangers Movie, 1997; 20th Century Fox Home Entertainment
 Mighty Morphin Power Rangers: The Movie/Turbo: A Power Rangers Movie, 1995, 1997; 20th Century Fox Home Entertainment (DVD compilation set of both movies.)
 The Best of the Power Rangers: The Ultimate Rangers, 2003; Buena Vista Home Entertainment (DVD compilation of episodes from five different seasons of Power Rangers. The episodes include "Forever Red" and "White Light" [Tommy's reintroduction as the White Power Ranger])
 Power Rangers Ninja Storm Volumes 1–5, 2003; Buena Vista Home Entertainment
 Power Rangers Dino Thunder Volumes 1–5, 2004; Buena Vista Home Entertainment
 Power Rangers S.P.D. Volumes 1–5, 2005; Buena Vista Home Entertainment
 Power Rangers Mystic Force Volumes 1–3 and 'Dark Wish', 2006; Buena Vista Home Entertainment
 Power Rangers Operation Overdrive Volumes 1–5, 2007; Buena Vista Home Entertainment (The release of an entire season for the first time in the US.)
 Power Rangers Jungle Fury Volumes 1 & 2, 2008; Walt Disney Studios Home Entertainment (Volumes 3–5 are only available in the UK.)
 Power Rangers RPM Volumes 1 & 2, 2009; Walt Disney Studios Home Entertainment
 Power Rangers RPM 'Bandai Demo DVD', 2009; Walt Disney Studios Home Entertainment (A promo DVD given away at Disney Stores. Contains the episode In or Out).
 Power Rangers Samurai Volumes 1–5, 2012; Lionsgate Home Entertainment
 Power Rangers Samurai "Monster Bash" and 2 MMPR Halloween episodes; Lionsgate Home Entertainment
 Power Rangers Samurai "Christmas Together, Samurai Forever" and 2 MMPR Christmas episodes; Lionsgate Home Entertainment
 Power Rangers Super Samurai Volumes 1–4 plus The Complete Series; Lionsgate Home Entertainment

Internationally, additional DVD releases have occurred (such as Lightspeed Rescue, Time Force and Wild Force in Germany) and as free DVDs attached to the Jetix magazine, published in the UK. Mighty Morphin Power Rangers Season 1, Season 2, and Season 3, Power Rangers Zeo, Power Rangers Turbo, and Power Rangers in Space have been released in Germany as well in both English and German, with Power Rangers Lost Galaxy only in German. Additionally, Ninja Storm, Dino Thunder, S.P.D., Mystic Force, and Operation Overdrive saw complete boxset releases in the UK. In France, Mighty Morphin Season 1 and Season 2 have been released in their entirety in 5 episode DVD volumes, and the first 25 episodes of Season 3 were released in May 2008. In Italy, Mighty Morphin, Zeo, Dino Thunder and S.P.D. have appeared in their entirety. Zeo and S.P.D. were made available as commercial DVDs, while Mighty Morphin and Dino Thunder were issued as bi-weekly volumes at newsstands.

The iTunes Store previously made Power Rangers episodes available: part of Mighty Morphin Power Rangers, all of Power Rangers S.P.D., and the first 26 episodes of Power Rangers Mystic Force. Subsequent seasons and episodes of the program also made their appearances in the iTunes Store, but , Turbo: A Power Rangers Movie is the only Power Rangers film available. In 2012, Mighty Morphin Power Rangers Season 1 volumes 1 & 2 were released on iTunes to coincide with the DVD releases. As of February 2013, all 3 seasons of MMPR were released on iTunes.

On June 15, 2011, all episodes of Power Rangers from Mighty Morphin Power Rangers Season 1 to Mighty Morphin Power Rangers re-version were made available for instant streaming on Netflix. In 2015, Power Rangers became available on the iTunes Store. In 2021, all episodes of Power Rangers (excluding Mighty Morphin Power Rangers (season 1) to Mighty Morphin Power Rangers re-version and Power Rangers Beast Morphers) were removed from Netflix.

On March 12, 2012, Shout! Factory announced a home video distribution deal with Saban, which includes the first 17 series of Power Rangers. Shout! Factory released the first seven seasons on DVD in August 2012, seasons 8–12 in November 2013, a 20-year collection in December 2013, and seasons 13–17 in April 2014.

On March 22, 2012 Lionsgate Home Entertainment reached a home media distribution deal with Saban to release Power Rangers Samurai to DVD and Blu-ray.

Toys
On February 15, 2018, Saban Brands announced that their 25-year partnership with Bandai would end in 2019. The next day, it was confirmed that Hasbro would be the new "global master toy licensee" for the franchise starting in April 2019, with a future option for Hasbro to buy the entire franchise. Hasbro paid $22.25 million upon the toy contract's closure. When they acquired the franchise as a whole later that year, that amount was credited against the purchase price paid to Saban for the series and related assets.

Hasbro has since sublicensed some toy rights to companies including Threezero and Super7.

Video games

Comics

Power Rangers has had several series of comics over the years.

 Mighty Morphin Power Rangers, Hamilton Comics, 1994–1995.
 Mighty Morphin Power Rangers, Marvel Comics, 1995–1996.
 Power Rangers Zeo, Image Comics, 1996.
 Power Rangers Turbo, Saban Powerhouse, 1997.
 Power Rangers Ninja Storm, Disney Adventures, 2003.
 Power Rangers Ninja Storm, Tokyopop, 2003–2004.
 Power Rangers Ninja Storm, Jetix, 2003.
 Power Rangers Dino Thunder, Tokyopop, 2004.
 Power Rangers Dino Thunder, Jetix Magazine, 2004.
 Power Rangers S.P.D., Jetix Magazine, 2005.
 Power Rangers Operation Overdrive, Jetix Magazine, 2007.
 Power Rangers Super Samurai, Papercutz, 2012.
 Power Rangers Megaforce, Papercutz, 2013.
 Mighty Morphin Power Rangers, Papercutz, 2014.

In 2015, Boom! Studios won the Power Rangers comics license, which brought a lot of award-winning publications.

 Mighty Morphin Power Rangers, BOOM! Studios, 2016–present.
 Mighty Morphin Power Rangers: Pink, BOOM! Studios, 2016–2017.
 Mighty Morphin Power Rangers: Annuals, BOOM! Studios, 2016–present.
 Power Rangers: Aftershock, BOOM! Studios, 2017.
 Go Go Power Rangers, BOOM! Studios, 2017–present.
 Justice League/Mighty Morphin Power Rangers. BOOM! Studios/DC Comics, 2017.

 Books 
In November 2018, Insight Editions released Power Rangers: The Ultimate Visual History, detailing the various toys and television seasons over the franchise's 25-year run.

See also

 Big Bad Beetleborgs Kamen Rider: Dragon Knight List of Power Rangers cast members
 Masked Rider Mystic Knights of Tir Na Nog Ninja Turtles: The Next Mutation Super Sentai Superhuman Samurai Syber-Squad Tattooed Teenage Alien Fighters from Beverly Hills VR Troopers''
 List of highest-grossing media franchises

Notes

References

External links

 at Fox Kids
 Power Rangers at Bandai

 
Mass media franchises introduced in 1993
Works by Saban Capital Group
1993 American television series debuts
2000s American television series
2010s American television series
2020s American television series
ABC Kids (TV programming block)
Action figures
American children's action television series
American Broadcasting Company original programming
American television series based on Japanese television series
Bandai brands
English-language Netflix original programming
Fox Broadcasting Company original programming
Japan in non-Japanese culture
Jetix original programming
2010s Nickelodeon original programming
2020s Nickelodeon original programming
Superheroes
Television franchises
1990s toys
2000s toys
2010s toys
2020s toys
Television shows adapted into films
Television shows adapted into comics
Television shows adapted into video games
Television shows adapted into plays
Hasbro brands
Fox Kids